Boneh Gaz (also Romanized as Boneh-ye Gaz and Boneh-ye Gez) is a village in Baghak Rural District of the Central District of Tangestan County, Bushehr province, Iran. At the 2006 census, its population was 2,960 in 725 households. The following census in 2011 counted 3,305 people in 897 households. The latest census in 2016 showed a population of 3,254 people in 962 households; it was the largest village in its rural district.

References 

Populated places in Tangestan County